A Regra do Jogo (Rules of the Game) is a Brazilian primetime telenovela, created by João Emanuel Carneiro for Rede Globo, it premiered on August 31, 2015 at 9 pm timeslot. The cast includes Alexandre Nero, Giovanna Antonelli, Vanessa Giacomo, Cauã Reymond, Eduardo Moscovis, Marco Pigossi, Susana Vieira, Tony Ramos and Cássia Kis in the lead roles.

Episodes

2015

References

TV Globo
Lists of soap opera episodes